Crakows or crackowes were a style of shoes with extremely long toes very popular in 15th century Europe. They were so named because the style was thought to have originated in Kraków, the then capital of Poland. They are also known as poulaines or pikes, though the term poulaine, as in souliers à la poulaine, "shoes in the Polish fashion", referred to the long pointed beak of the shoe, not the shoe itself.

History
Long-toed shoes had been popular in Europe at different times, first appearing in the archaeological record in the 12th century and falling in and out of fashion periodically. They reached their most exaggerated form in the third quarter of the 15th century before falling out of fashion in the 1480s.

The arrival of this fashion in England is traditionally associated with the marriage of Richard II and Anne of Bohemia in 1382. An anonymous 'monk of Evesham' recorded in 1394: "With this queen there came from Bohemia into England those accursed vices (English Cracowys or Pykys) half a yard in length, thus it was necessary for them to be tied to the shin with chains of silver before they could walk with them."

However, there are indications they were worn as early as the 1360s. The author of the Eulogium Historiarum describes men of this period as wearing "points on their shoes as long as your finger that are called crakowes; more suitable as claws... for demons than as ornaments for men."

Fourteenth-century poulaine-toed shoes found in London were found only in men's sizes, but 15th century art shows them being worn by both men and women, with the toes of men's shoes being the most extravagantly long. They were a controversial fashion and faced criticism from several quarters. In 1368, Charles V of France issued an edict banning their construction and use in Paris. An English poem from 1388 complained that men were unable to kneel in prayer because their toes were too long.

In 1463, Edward IV passed a sumptuary law restricting anyone "under the state of a Lord, Esquire, [or] Gentleman" from wearing poulaines over the length of two inches. In 1465, they were banned in England altogether, so that all cordwainers and cobblers within the City of London were prohibited from making shoes with pikes more than two inches long.

The poulaine inspired later footwear fashions, such as the 1950s Winklepicker boots.

Features

Stuffing
Poulaine toes were packed with stuffing to provide rigidity and help them hold their shape. Surviving examples from medieval London have the points stuffed with moss. An Italian chronicler noted in 1388 that they were also sometimes stuffed with horsehair.

Tying up the toes
Although there is no archaeological or medieval iconographic evidence to support the idea that the toes were ever tied up to the leg, as noted earlier, there is direct literary evidence dating from 1394 which states that this was the practice at the time these shoes were introduced into England.  Additionally, the practice is mentioned by the antiquarian John Stow in his 1698 publication A Survey of London, where he wrote:

However, given that John Stow was writing over 100 years after the shoes fell out of fashion, and the lack of rigorous historical research in the writings of the time, he cannot be considered a reliable source. His record of Act 4 of Edward IV is exaggerated—the actual act does mention restrictions in length, but not monetary penalties, parliament or clergy:

Poulaines as overshoes
Overshoes made from leather or cork, called pattens, were frequently worn with late medieval shoes both indoors and outdoors. The shape of pattens reflected the style of shoes in different periods, and pattens during the period where poulaine toes were fashionable have matching long toes. These pattens would have supported the toe of the shoes if required.

Toe length
Archaeological evidence in the form of surviving shoe soles shows that the length of the point beyond the toes of the foot was rarely, if ever, more than 50% of the length of the foot.This is consistent with depictions of highly fashionable European men from the third quarter of the 15th century when poulaine toes were at the height of their popularity.

As with many items of high fashion the most extreme examples were worn by the upper classes. In periods when poulaine toes were popular most shoes were somewhat pointed, even those used during warfare.  There is clear evidence from the Battle of Sempach that in certain periods soldiers on campaign wore shoes with toes so long as to interfere with the wearer's ability to run.  In that battle, it became necessary for the knights of Leopold III, Duke of Austria, to dismount and fight on foot, and because they did not have time to prepare for the engagement, they were forced to cut off the tips of their poulaines. The Swiss chroniclers report how a huge pile of these shoe-tips was found in a heap after the battle, and they are also depicted in the background of the battle scene in the Luzerner Schilling of 1513.

A surviving pair of sabatons belonging to Maximilian I, Holy Roman Emperor, have extremely long poulaines, but they were used only on horseback, and in this case the long points were detachable from the sabatons for foot combat. The catches can be seen over the area of the big toe.

See also

Pointed shoe
Venetian-style shoe
Pigache
Winklepicker
Duckbill shoe (contrasting succeeding style)

References

Shoes
Historical footwear
Polish clothing
Medieval European costume
15th century in Europe